Omegophora is a genus of pufferfishes native to the coastal waters of Australia.

Species
There are currently two recognized species in this genus:
 Omegophora armilla (Waite & McCulloch, 1915) (Ringed toadfish)
 Omegophora cyanopunctata Hardy & Hutchins, 1981 (Bluespotted toadfish)

References

Tetraodontidae
Taxa named by Gilbert Percy Whitley
Marine fish genera